Prkos may refer to:

 Prkos, Koprivnica-Križevci County, a village near Rasinja, Croatia
 Prkos, Zadar County, a village near Škabrnja, Croatia
 Prkos Lasinjski, a village in Karlovac County, Croatia